Love Kills! is In Strict Confidence's third studio album.

Track listing

The last track is 666 seconds of complete silence.

There is also a Limited Fan Edition boxset - 1000 copies. It includes: album CD, 3" bonus CD, 16 page oversized booklet, condom, metal-pin, postcard set and sticker set.

3" bonus CD in the limited edition box set contains 3 remixes by Controlled Fusion.

Bonus CD track listing

References

External links 
 Album Page at Discogs

In Strict Confidence albums
2000 albums